Neolepolepis is a genus of scaly-winged barklice in the family Lepidopsocidae. There are at least four described species in Neolepolepis.

Species
These four species belong to the genus Neolepolepis:
 Neolepolepis caribensis (Turner, 1975)
 Neolepolepis leticiae (Garcia Aldrete, 1984)
 Neolepolepis occidentalis (Mockford, 1955)
 Neolepolepis xerica (Garcia Aldrete, 1984)

References

Trogiomorpha
Articles created by Qbugbot